Gerald Eustis Thomas (June 23, 1929 – March 20, 2019), was an American naval officer, diplomat and academic. He was the second African American to achieve the rank of Rear Admiral in the U.S. Navy.

Early life
Thomas was born in Natick, Massachusetts, the son of Walter W. and Leila L. (née Jacobs) Thomas. He was educated at Natick High School, going on to spend a year studying at the University of Nebraska–Lincoln before transferring to Harvard University. He graduated from Harvard in 1951 with a Bachelor of Arts in biochemical sciences.

Naval career 
During his time at Harvard, Thomas was a member of the Naval Reserve Officers Training Corps and joined the Navy after graduation. He was commissioned as an ensign on June 1, 1951, serving aboard  for three years, barring three months spent at the Destroyer Force, US Atlantic Fleet Engineering School in Newport, Rhode Island.

While assigned to the Worcester, he attended the Combat Information Center Watch Officer and Day Air Control School in Boston, Massachusetts. He then learned to speak Russian at the Defense Language Institute, qualifying as an interpreter in 1957 and serving at the National Security Agency in Fort Meade.

The following year he became commander of the College Training Program at the Bureau of Naval Personnel. In 1965 he was back in the Naval War College in Newport, where he was chosen as the 1965-66 Distinguished Graduate of the School of Naval Command and Staff.

As a result of meritorious service between March 31 and October 15, 1967 he was awarded the Navy Commendation Medal with Combat V. Back on dry land, in April, 1968, he became executive officer of the Naval Reserve Officers Training Corps unit at Prairie View A&M College in Texas and was awarded the Meritorious Service Medal.

In 1973 he took command of Destroyer Squadron 9, concluding this command with his appointment as Rear Admiral in November 1974. He was the second African American to achieve this landmark, preceded only by Admiral Samuel L. Gravely, Jr. The newly promoted rear admiral became commander of Destroyer Squadron 5 before in 1975 becoming the acting Deputy Assistant Secretary of Defense for International Security Affairs, and then the Director of the Near East, South Asia and Africa region at the U.S. Department of Defense in the following year. From 1978 he served as the senior rear admiral on the U.S. Pacific Fleet before retiring from the Navy in 1981.

Diplomatic career 
Ronald Reagan appointed Thomas Ambassador United States Ambassador to Guyana on December 11, 1981. Thomas left Guyana on September 6, 1983, and was appointed Ambassador to Kenya a month later. He served in this capacity until leaving the diplomatic service on September 29, 1989.

Academic career 
Thomas continued to study throughout his naval career, gaining a Master of Science degree from George Washington University in 1966, and a Ph.D. in diplomatic history from Yale University in 1973. On returning from Kenya, he joined the faculty at Yale, teaching in the African-American Studies program and the history department. Thomas's relationship with his students was an important factor in his selection as Master of Davenport College in 1991. Thomas served in this capacity for 10 years before retiring in July, 2001.

Thomas is a member of Alpha Phi Alpha fraternity.

Personal life and death
He is married to Rhoda (née Henderson), and the couple have two sons and a daughter. He died on March 20, 2019 in New Haven, Connecticut at the age of 89.

References

1929 births
African-American United States Navy personnel
United States Navy personnel of the Vietnam War
Ambassadors of the United States to Guyana
2019 deaths
Ambassadors of the United States to Kenya
Harvard University alumni
African-American diplomats
United States Navy admirals
Yale University faculty
21st-century African-American people
20th-century American diplomats
African Americans in the Vietnam War
20th-century African-American people